South Antrim (Ulster Scots: Sooth Anthrim) is a constituency in the Northern Ireland Assembly.

The seat was first used for a Northern Ireland-only election for the Northern Ireland Assembly, 1973. It usually shares boundaries with the South Antrim UK Parliament constituency, however the boundaries of the two constituencies were slightly different from 1983 to 1986 as the Assembly boundaries had not caught up with Parliamentary boundary changes and from 1996 to 1997 when members of the Northern Ireland Forum had been elected from the newly drawn Parliamentary constituencies but the 51st Parliament of the United Kingdom, elected in 1992 under the 1983–95 constituency boundaries, was still in session.

Members were then elected from the constituency to the 1975 Constitutional Convention, the 1982 Assembly, the 1996 Forum and then to the current Assembly from 1998.

For further details of the history and boundaries of the constituency, see South Antrim (UK Parliament constituency).

Members

Note: The columns in this table are used only for presentational purposes, and no significance should be attached to the order of columns. For details of the order in which seats were won at each election, see the detailed results of that election.

Elections

Northern Ireland Assembly

2022

2017

2016

2011

2007

2003

1998

1996 forum
Successful candidates are shown in bold.

1982

1975 Constitutional Convention

1973

References

Constituencies of the Northern Ireland Assembly
Politics of County Antrim
1973 establishments in Northern Ireland
Constituencies established in 1973